Dead center or dead centre means an exact geometric center, as of a target.

It may also refer to:

Engineering 
 Dead centre (engineering), a position of a crank where the applied force is straight along its axis
 Dead center (tool), a type of lathe center used for accurately positioning a workpiece on an axis

Music 
 Dead Center (Game Theory album), a 1984 power pop album
 Dead Center (Eric Alexander album), a 2004 jazz album
 Dead Center Productions, a Ukraine-based record label for heavy metal music

Other media 
 deadCENTER Film Festival, an Oklahoma film festival established in 2001
 Dead Center, a 1993 film directed by Steve Carver
 The Dead Center, a 2018 film starring Shane Carruth
 Dead Center, a campaign in the 2009 video game Left 4 Dead 2
 "Top Dead Center", a column by Kevin Cameron in Cycle World magazine